No Tourists is the seventh studio album by English electronic music band the Prodigy, released on 2 November 2018 on Take Me to the , their independent label managed by BMG. The album debuted at No. 1 on the UK Albums Chart, their seventh consecutive studio album to do so.

No Tourists is the final studio album to feature Keith Flint who died in March 2019. To support the album, the Prodigy began a world tour in November 2018. After Flint's death, the remaining tour dates were cancelled.

Background and writing
In July 2015, three months after the release of their previous album The Day Is My Enemy, songwriter and producer Liam Howlett revealed the group's desire to shift their output from albums to EPs due to the long process and to deliver new material to fans quicker. In 2017, Howlett started to prepare new material for a proposed EP and "Fight Fire with Fire" was the first track he worked on, co-written by American hip hop duo Ho99o9. The song was originally a remix that Howlett had agreed to produce for them, but the two parties agreed to include it on No Tourists as it fitted the "feel and flow" of the album. Howlett was pleased with the results and entered productive sessions: "Once I had finished that, I was on a flow". After six months he had ideas for six complete songs.

Despite their original intention of making an EP with various collaborators, including Dizzee Rascal, and resume touring, Howlett noticed the subsequent writing sessions delivered strong enough material at a faster pace compared to previous Prodigy records, which influenced the decision to commit to a full album. In September 2017, the band announced that they had signed a recording deal with BMG Rights Management, giving them the green-light to produce a new studio album.

Howlett thought No Tourists displays the same amount of aggression as other Prodigy albums, "but in a different way". Despite his major input on the record, Howlett maintained that No Tourists is "very much a band album" and features vocal contributions from his bandmates Keith Flint and Maxim, plus collaborations with Ho99o9 and English singer-songwriter Barns Courtney. "Need Some1" was described by Howlett as a "sample, smash and grab-type of beat" and features a vocal sample of American disco singer Loleatta Holloway.

Recording
The album was written, produced, and mixed by Howlett in the course of a year at Tileyard Studios in King's Cross, London. Howlett wrote the new songs with their live performance being a priority in their style and arrangement, and aimed to include "every angle that's good about the band" in the music. He made a conscious effort to write the new material differently to what he had done for The Day Is My Enemy, and went so far to avoid socialising with friends and sleep to obtain different patterns of thought and see how it affected the process. He also stayed clear from alcohol as he drank a lot throughout the recording of The Day Is My Enemy.

The group continued to work on the album while on tour, which included a session where Howlett wanted to capture Flint's vocals for "Champions of London" at a hotel room in Belgium after a particularly high energy gig using portable recording equipment that they travelled with. While the other band members and crew preferred to stay in better quality hotels, Howlett "veer[ed] off and stay in a one-star that's just two miles from the gigs, just so I can get stuff done quickly". In March 2018, during the group's tour of Russia, Howlett set-up a studio base in Moscow and returned to the facility to continue working after subsequent gigs to work on his new ideas. The set-up was a productive time for Howlett, who had close to three complete tracks by the time he left. After the album was finished, Howlett said that making it was "the most intense studio time I've ever had", and praised what everyone involved had contributed to it.

Design
On 19 July 2018, the album's title and front cover was revealed on the group's official Instagram page. Howlett maintained that the title was not a reference to immigration or any political message, and explained that it refers to the album's theme of escapism: "The want and need to be derailed. Don't be a tourist – there is always more danger and excitement to be found if you stray from the set path". The front depicts a Routemaster bus on route 7 with its destination being The Four Aces in Dalston, the location of the band's debut gig in 1990.

Promotion
On 19 July 2018, the album's lead single, "Need Some1", premiered on Annie Mac on BBC Radio 1. Its music video was released on YouTube after its debut broadcast. The video was directed by Paco Raterta and filmed in Manila. The second track, "Light Up the Sky", debuted on BBC Radio 6 on 26 September 2018 and made available later that day. It was used in the trailer for the F1 2019 game in 2019. “Fight Fire with Fire" featuring Ho99o9 was the third single, released on 11 October 2018.

On 24 October 2018, a secret listening party was held for invited fans who heard the album played in full in a secret location, which turned out to be Egg London, a nightclub next to Tileyard Studios where the album was recorded. The day after, a new track was premiered on Zane Lowe's Beats 1 show called "We Live Forever".

The Prodigy planned to support No Tourists with a world tour starting from November 2018, including dates in the UK, Europe, Australia, New Zealand, and the US. On 4 March 2019 frontman Keith Flint was found dead at his home in Essex, just weeks after playing six live dates in Australia and New Zealand. All future tour dates were cancelled on 5 March 2019.

Release
No Tourists was released on 2 November 2018 in various formats including CD, vinyl, and audio cassette.

The album debuted at No. 1 on the UK Albums Chart with sales of 23,952, including 1,828 from streaming, to become their seventh consecutive studio album to reach No. 1.

Reception

At Metacritic, which assigns a normalised rating out of 100 to reviews from mainstream critics, the album received an average score of 66, based on 15 reviews, which indicates "generally favorable reviews". In a pre-release review for AllMusic, Neil Z. Yeung gave the album three stars out of five. He stated: "Much like preceding albums The Day Is My Enemy and Invaders Must Die, No Tourists leaves little space to breathe, delivering a short and sweet set of blows to the head that was designed specifically for performing live. For better or worse, there aren't many new ideas here, but main man Liam Howlett is so adept at crafting explosive body-shakers that the lack of fresh concepts can be overlooked." Ben Devlin of musicOMH rated No Tourists two stars out of five. He noticed the many "references, or rip-offs, of old Prodigy material" throughout and the recycling of previous Prodigy songs which suggested to Devlin that the group were "artistically spent". Nonetheless, he considered "Give Me a Signal" a moment where "style and substance are both there, featuring an acidic 303 line and a dramatic final section". Devlin concluded: "It seems that the record saves its best for last". Mojo reviewer Ben Thompson gave the album three stars out of five, and pointed out that following an "unconvincing stab at collective irresponsibility" on The Day Is My Enemy, the latest effort from the band "marks a welcome return to unenlightened despotism". He noticed that four of the album's ten tracks refer to a type of explosion. While it covers "familiar sonic landscape" he thought that "it's also a lot of fun", picking on "Champions of London" and the "Fuck you!" lyric of "Boom Boom Tap" as such highlight moments.

Jamie MacMillan for Dork magazine gave No Tourists three stars out of five, opening with: "A series of big beats in search of a big hook". He noticed that it sounds "exactly how you would expect a new album from The Prodigy in 2018 to sound", but was thankful that "it (mostly) avoids" the recycling of beats used on previous songs. To him, the album does not take off until half way with "Fight Fire with Fire", a song that houses "one of the few moments where attitude and atmosphere really gel into something memorable", but felt disappointed that such a highlight moment is not repeated elsewhere. A two out of five star review was given by Rupert Howe for Q magazine, who thought the trio "seem in need of a new adventure". While he thought "Need Some1" would satisfy the band's hardcore fans, "much of what follows sounds like he's set his overdriven synths to autopilot", with contributions from Flint and Maxim "reduced to the odd irate interjection". He praised their collaboration with Ho99o9 on "Fight Fire with Fire", but rates "Champions of London" as a "shadow of their past glories" from the 1990s.

Track listing

Samples
 "Need Some1" samples "Crash goes Love" by Loleatta Holloway
 "Light Up the Sky" samples "Mam rád lidi" by Jiří Schelinger
 "We Live Forever" samples "Critical Beatdown" by Ultramagnetic MCs
 "No Tourists" contains sample of the film soundtrack to "Bullseye!"
 "Timebomb Zone" interpolates "Time Bomb (Dub Version)" by Alfonso feat. Jimi Tunnell
 "Boom Boom Tap" contains samples of "2 Weeks Sober" by Andy Milonakis
 "Resonate" contains samples of "Sound Killer" by Brother Culture

Personnel
The Prodigy
Liam Howlett – writing, keyboards, synthesisers, sampling, drum programming
Keith Flint – vocals on "We Live Forever", "Champions of London", and "Give Me a Signal"
Maxim – vocals on "Light Up the Sky", "We Live Forever", "No Tourists", and "Champions of London"

Additional personnel
Brother Culture – vocals on "Light Up the Sky" and "Resonate"
Ho99o9 (Jean "theOGM" Lebrun, Lawrence "Eaddy" Eaddy) – vocals on "Fight Fire with Fire"
Barns Courtney – vocals on "Give Me a Signal"
Olly Burden – guitar on "Light Up the Sky", "Fight Fire with Fire", and "Champions of London"
Leo Crabtree – live drums on "Champions of London"

Production
Liam Howlett – production, recording, engineering, mixing
James Rushent – production on "Need Some1" and "Resonate"
Olly Burden – co-production on "Light Up the Sky", "Fight Fire with Fire", "Timebomb Zone", "Champions of London", "Boom Boom Tap", and "Give Me a Signal"
Richard Adlam – sample recreation production on "Timebomb Zone"
Hal Ritson – sample recreation production on "Timebomb Zone"
René LaVice – additional production elements on "Champions of London"
Robert Chetcuti and Jim Pavloff – assistance on "Need Some1"
Rob Jevons – assistance on "Champions of London"
Prash "Engine-Earz" Mistry – mastering (incl. stem mastering on "Fight Fire with Fire", "Boom Boom Tap", and "Give Me a Signal") (at FORWA3DSTUDIOS, London)
Linden Jay – mastering assistant (at FORWA3DSTUDIOS, London)
Luke Insect – artwork and sleeve design
Rahul Singh – photography

Charts

Certifications

References

Sources

2018 albums
The Prodigy albums
Albums produced by Liam Howlett